Organozirconium chemistry is the science of exploring the properties, structure, and reactivity of organozirconium compounds, which are organometallic compounds containing chemical bonds between carbon and zirconium. Organozirconium compounds have been widely studied, in part because they are useful catalysts in Ziegler-Natta polymerization.

Comparison with organotitanium chemistry
Many organozirconium compounds have analogues on organotitanium chemistry.  Zirconium(IV) is more resistant to reduction than titanium(IV) compounds, which often convert to Ti(III) derivatives. By the same token, Zr(II) is a particularly powerful reducing agent, forming robust dinitrogen complexes. Being a larger atom, zirconium forms complexes with higher coordination numbers, e.g. polymeric [CpZrCl3]n vs monomeric CpTiCl3 (Cp = C5H5).

History
Zirconocene dibromide was prepared in 1953 by a reaction of the cyclopentadienyl magnesium bromide and zirconium(IV) chloride. In 1966, the dihydride Cp2ZrH2 was obtained by the reaction of Cp2Zr(BH4)2 with triethylamine. In 1970, the related hydrochloride (now called Schwartz's reagent) was obtained by reduction of zirconacene dichloride (Cp2ZrCl2) with lithium aluminium hydride (or the related LiAlH(t-BuO)3).  The development of organozirconium reagents was recognized by a Nobel Prize in Chemistry to Ei-Ichi Negishi.

Zirconocene chemistry

The foremost applications of zirconocenes involve their use as catalysts for olefin polymerization.

Schwartz's reagent ([Cp2ZrHCl]2) participates in hydrozirconation, which enjoys some use in organic synthesis.  Substrates for hydrozirconation are alkenes and alkynes. Terminal alkynes give vinyl complexes. Secondary reactions are nucleophilic additions, transmetalations, conjugate additions, coupling reactions, carbonylation, and halogenation.

Extensive chemistry has also been demonstrated from decamethylzirconocene dichloride, Cp*2ZrCl2.  Well-studied derivatives include Cp*2ZrH2, [Cp*2Zr]2(N2)3, Cp*2Zr(CO)2, and Cp*2Zr(CH3)2.

Zirconocene dichloride can be used to cyclise enynes and dienes to give cyclic or bicyclic aliphatic systems.

Alkyl and CO complexes
The simplest organozirconium compounds are the homoleptic alkyls.  Salts of [Zr(CH3)6]2- are known. Tetrabenzylzirconium is a precursor to many catalysts for olefin polymerization.  It can be converted to mixed alkyl, alkoxy, and halide derivatives, Zr(CH2C6H5)3X (X = CH3, OC2H5, Cl).

In addition to mixed Cp2Zr(CO)2, zirconium forms the binary carbonyl [Zr(CO)6]2-.

Organohafnium chemistry
Organohafnium compounds behave nearly identically to organozirconium compounds, as hafnium is just below zirconium on the periodic table. Many Hf analogues of Zr compounds are known, including bis(cyclopentadienyl)hafnium(IV) dichloride, bis(cyclopentadienyl)hafnium(IV) dihydride, and dimethylbis(cyclopentadienyl)hafnium(IV).

Cationic hafnocene complexes,  post-metallocene catalysts, are used on an industrial scale for the polymerization of alkenes.

Additional reading

References